Eubranchus rubrocerata is a species of sea slug or nudibranch, a marine gastropod mollusc in the family Eubranchidae.

Distribution
This species was described from 10m depth, Kpone Bay, Greater Accra Region, Ghana.

References

Eubranchidae
Gastropods described in 2015